Old Warden Castle, also known as Quince Hill, is located in the village of Old Warden, in the county of Bedfordshire, England.

It is uncertain whether it is a motte castle or a ringwork.

Roman and Celtic remains have also been located at the site.

Today, only earthworks remain. These are known locally as Quints or Quince Hill. In 1995 the site was classified as a Scheduled Monument.

See also
Castles in Great Britain and Ireland
List of castles in England

References

External links 
 Gatehouse Gazetteer
 English Heritage Monument No. 362766
 Investigation History

Castles in Bedfordshire
Scheduled monuments in Bedfordshire
Ringwork castles